Mi familia perfecta is an American Telenovela created by José Vicente Spataro that premiered on Telemundo on 9 April 2018 and concluded on 13 July 2018. The series revolves around of the Guerrero family, a family so united, as dysfunctional, formed by five siblings who were left alone when their father died and their mother was deported.

The series stars Jorge Luis Moreno, Sabrina Seara, and Gala Montes, returning to the network after leaving their mark in the hit Super Series El Señor de los Cielos.

Plot 
The series tells the story of Los Guerrero, five siblings struggling to achieve the American dream and get ahead after the death of their father and the deportation of their mother to Mexico. Los Guerrero must demonstrate that they are a very united family to face the different obstacles and situations faced by immigrants in the United States. Dysfunctional but always united, these siblings, El Patas (Jorge Luis Moreno), Rosa (Laura Chimaras), Marisol (Gala Montes), Julián (Gabriel Tarantini) and Lili (Ainhoa Paz), will live the difficult situation of seeing their mother, Irma (Laura Flores), take on the painful decision to leave them in Houston, United States to assure them a better future when she is deported to Mexico. From this moment, the Guerreros will have to support each other to overcome the obstacles of an immigrant family in the United States, achieve the American dream, and at the same time, remain united under one roof. In their struggle, they will have the support of Erika Ramírez (Sabrina Seara), a social worker who takes on the case of these five siblings, and Santiago Vélez (Mauricio Henao), a male soccer coach who discovers Marisol's talent playing soccer. Through her passion for this sport, Marisol will reactivate the faith in her family to continue fighting for her dreams regardless of the obstacles they have to face.

Cast and characters

Starring 
 Jorge Luis Moreno as José María Guerrero, better known as El Patas, a noble and loyal man whose main concern is to take care of his three sisters and younger brother. He always dreamed of being a professional footballer, but at 17 he had to abandon that dream.
 Emmanuel Pérez as 17-year-old José María Guerrero.
 Sabrina Seara as Erika Ramírez, she is a very serious and correct social worker who seeks justice for unprotected minors.
 Gala Montes as Marisol Guerrero, she was forced to assume the maternal role of her brothers when she was barely 12 and her mother was deported to Mexico. Her main passion is soccer.
 Laura Flores as Irma Solís, she is the mother of the Guerrero siblings.
 Mauricio Henao as Santiago Vélez, he is the son of Amparo and a female soccer coach.
 Laura Chimaras as Rosa Guerrero, a young woman who after the death of her father and the deportation of her mother did not assume the responsibility of becoming the mother figure of her four siblings and grew up feeling that with her beauty she could get everything she wanted.
 Gabriel Tarantini as Julián Guerrero, a nice, roguish and very handsome young man who is a magnet for problems because of his impulsive and immature behavior.
 Ainhoa Paz as Lili Guerrero, she is the youngest of the Guerrero siblings. She is a loving and intelligent girl but in need of affection since she grew up in chaos and with the emotional deficiencies of a dysfunctional family marked by maternal absence.

Also starring 
 Sonya Smith as Dakota Johnson, a woman of scarce resources and little education who feels proud that her family is "redneck". With a dominant and aggressive attitude, she has two daughters Ashely and Tiffany.
 Coraima Torres as Amparo De Vélez, she is the mother of Santiago and Miguel's wife. Amparo is a well-known psychiatrist in Colombia, author of many books.
 Karla Monroig as Camilia Pérez, she is the wife of Tito Pérez. Mother of Eddie and Génesis. Born in Puerto Rico and defender of her Latin roots. She wanted to take care of the Guerrero brothers, when they deported Irma; but this one did not accept it.
 Juan Pablo Shuk as Miguel Ángel Vélez, Santiago's father.
 Natasha Domínguez as Ashley Johnson, Dakota's daughter.
 Daniela Navarro as Antonia Cadenas, she owns a grocery store and Vicente's wife.
 Beatriz Monroy as Francisca Rojas, better known as Panchita, was born in Mexico and was the best friend of Irma's mother.
 Roberto Plantier as Vicente Cadenas, Antonia's husband.
 José Guillermo Cortines as Tito Pérez, he is married to Camila, is the father of Eddie and Génesis.
 Veronica Schneider as Alma Izaguirre the Guerrero's new social worker
 Francisco Rubio as Daniel Mendoza, Irma's lover.

 Laura Vieira as Andrea Fox, she is the director of the women's soccer club in which Santiago works.
 Estefany Oliveira as Megan Summers, she plays as a defense in the club team that Marisol enters.
 Enrique Montaño as Marcos, Rosa's boyfriend.
 Paulina Matos as Penélope Díaz, she is the front of the football club where Marisol also plays.
 Michelle Taurel as Tiffany Johnson, Dakota's daughter.
 Michelle De Andrade as Génesis Pérez, she is the youngest daughter of Tito and Camila.
 Ana Wolfermann as Sandra Ryan, like Penélope, Sandy leads the team.
 Jerry Rivera Mendoza as Eddie Pérez, he is the eldest son of Tito and Camila.
 Diego Herrera as Maddox Guerrero, Ashley's son.
 Matheo Cruz as Danielito, Irma and Daniel's son

Recurring characters 
 Eduardo Orozco as Felipe, Rosa's boyfriend.
 Ricardo Álamo as Rafael
 Beatriz Valdés as Mireya

Ratings 
 
}}

Episodes

Awards and nominations

References

External links 
 

2018 telenovelas
American telenovelas
Telemundo telenovelas
Spanish-language American telenovelas
Spanish-language telenovelas
2018 American television series debuts
2018 American television series endings
2010s American LGBT-related drama television series